This is a list of women company founders, sorted alphabetically:

A
Mo Abudu
Olajumoke Adenowo
Salwa Idrissi Akhannouch
Folorunsho Alakija
Jessica Alba
Janine Allis
Mother Angelica
Cheryl Arrowsmith
Laura Ashley
Bolanle Austen-Peters
Linda Avey

B
Viveka Babajee
Bibi Bakare-Yusuf
Romana Acosta Bañuelos
Drew Barrymore
Ayah Bdeir
Olive Ann Beech
Alice Bentinck
Gina Bianchini
Sara Blakely
Francesca Bortolotto Possati
Anita Schjøll Brede
Sandra Bullock
Tory Burch
Margaret Busby
Lauren Bush
Leah Busque

C
Jan Cameron
Julie Chaiken
Coco Chanel
Nancy T. Chang
Eva Chen
Jane Chen
Leeann Chin
Phyllis Christian
Yael Cohen
Jenny Craig
Jan Crouch
Lucia Cunanan
Louisa Knapp Curtis

D
Evelyn de Mille 
Dorimène Roy Desjardins 
Marthe Distel  
Jenny Doan  
Donna Dubinsky
Helen Duhamel  
Marguerite Durand
Adele Duttweiler

E
Fifi Ejindu
Inger McCabe Elliott
Jeri Ellsworth
Judith Estrin
Melanie Eusebe

F
Caterina Fake  
Lizanne Falsetto  
Tara Fela-Durotoye  
Samrawit Fikru
Doris F. Fisher 
Jennifer Fleiss  
Ping Fu

G
Susie Galvez
Jennifer Garner
Muma Gee
Françoise Giroud
Anne Glover
Diane Greene
Serena Guen

H
Kathryn Hach-Darrow
Vivienne Harris (businesswoman)
Dianne Haskett
Christy Haubegger
Diane Hendricks
Carolina Herrera (fashion designer)
Ingeborg Hochmair
Catherine Hoke
Krisztina Holly
Elizabeth Holmes
Jessica Huntley
Jennifer Hyman

I
Marian Ilitch
Janine Irons

J
Jessica Jackley
Christine Jennings
Mary Lou Jepsen
Margaret Josephs

K
Katherine Anna Kang
Elle Kaplan
Margaret Karcher
Kathy Keeton
Kehinde Kamson
Carolyn Kepcher
Miranda Kerr
Nicole Kersh
Nicole Kidman
Jasmina King
Natalia King
Tina Knowles
Beyoncé Knowles-Carter
Sandra Kurtzig

L
Maxine Lapiduss
Dylan Lauren
Aileen Lee
 Hayley Leibson
Prue Leith
Bonnie Leman
Tara Lemmey
Jacqueline Leo
Sandy Lerner
Christine Liang
Andrea Lo
Jennifer Lopez

M
Julie Macklowe
Christine Magee
Marjorie Magner
Alice Marriott
Natalie Massenet
Jennifer McGarigle
Sara Anne McLagan
Sarma Melngailis
Teresa H. Meng
Heidi Messer
Janee Michelle
Carole Middleton
Kathryn Minshew
Brit Morin
Beth Murphy
Margaret Lally "Ma" Murray

N
Nicole Notat

O
Ola Orekunrin
Mildred Ellen Orton

P
Despina Papadopoulos
Alicia Patterson
Monique Péan
Melissa Perello
Irina Petrushova
Tiffany Pham
Mary Pickford
Laurene Powell Jobs
Jane Pratt
Jennifer N. Pritzker
Penny Pritzker

R
Laurice Rahmé
Davina Reichman
Heather Reisman
Anita Roddick
Rossana Rossanda
Martine Rothblatt
Helena Rubinstein
Michele Ruiz
Sarina Russo

S
Mary Ann Sainsbury
Harriet Samuel, founder of H. Samuel
Selena
Mary Ann Shadd
Tina Sharkey
Clara Shih
Naomi Simson
Esther Snyder
Kate Spade
Christine Spiten
Patti Stanger
Sally Steele
Debbie Sterling
Martha Stewart
Jill Stuart
Riniki Bhuyan Sarma

T
Vivienne Tam
Therese Tucker

U

V
Gloria Vanderbilt
Deena Varshavskaya
Fernanda Viégas

W
Lila Bell Wallace
Cher Wang
Vera Wang
Haley Webb
Patti Webster
Margaret Weis
Meg Whitman
Verna Wilkins
Virginia Williamson
Oprah Winfrey
Anne Wojcicki
Victoria Woodhull

Y
Lovie Yancey
Peggy Yu
Dina Yuen

Z
Zhou Qunfei
Lydia Zimmermann

References

Company founders

Women company founders